The Håtuna games (Swedish: Håtunaleken) were a 1306 conflict between Birger, King of Sweden  (1280–1321) and his two brothers, the dukes  Eric Magnusson (ca. 1281-1318) and Valdemar Magnusson (c. 1282–1318).

Background
When Magnus Ladulås died in 1290, his eldest son Birger Magnusson was only 10 years old. He had already been elected as successor as a four-year-old, and he (and the kingdom of Sweden) now had a guardian, marshal Torgils Knutsson. In 1304 his brothers signed a document that forbade them from conducting their own foreign policy and kept them out of the royal court unless they had specifically been summoned. The bitterness over this agreement was probably the cause of the Håtuna games.

When marshal Torgils Knutsson returned from the third and last crusade in Finland in 1293, a feud had developed between the brothers, with Torgils supporting King Birger. Duke Eric, as a leader of men and politician possibly better king material than Birger, tried to establish an independent kingdom around Bohuslän, which he had received as part of his marriage to the princess Ingeborg of Norway, and Halland at the boundary between Sweden, Norway, and Denmark. A civil war broke out, but by 1306 emotions had cooled to the point where the dukes acknowledged the son of Birger, Magnus Birgersson, as the successor to the throne. The marshal, Torgils Knutsson, was captured in 1305 by the dukes and was executed in 1306 in Stockholm by decapitation.

The Håtuna games
On September 29, 1306, Duke Eric and Duke Valdemar arrived at King Birger's estate in Håtuna Parish by Lake Mälaren. They came from a wedding feast in Bjälbo, and Birger received them as guests at a party that derailed towards the middle of the night. Birger and his wife Martha of Denmark were captured by the dukes, and were imprisoned in the dungeon in Nyköping Castle. King Birger's son Magnus Birgersson was rescued by a courtier and sent to Denmark where he was taken up by king Eric VI.

Aftermath
Duke Eric took over power in Sweden. He was already sovereign in Halland and Bohuslän and, being married to princess Ingeborg, had aspirations to inherit the crown of Norway. But the closeness to Denmark became a threat, and King Eric VI of Denmark attacked Sweden, harassing Västergötland. Duke Eric's brother Valdemar wreaked revenge by plundering Skåne with a force of German mercenaries. The Norwegian king allied himself with the Danish king; this forced a settlement that allowed Birger to leave Nyköping Castle after two years' imprisonment.

For 10 years the brothers kept the peace with only smaller skirmishes. In 1317–1318, the Håtuna games had their final resolution at the gruesome Nyköping Banquet and subsequent events.

References

1306 in Europe
Political history of Sweden
Conflicts in 1306
14th century in Sweden